The 1995–96 Torquay United F.C. season was Torquay United's 62nd season in the Football League and their fourth consecutive season in Division Three. The season runs from 1 July 1995 to 30 June 1996.

References

 

1995–96 Football League Third Division by team
1995-96